The Dam Busters may refer to:

Operation Chastise, an attack by the RAF on German dams in World War II
No. 617 Squadron RAF, the Royal Air Force squadron who carried out Operation Chastise.
The Dam Busters (book), a 1951 book by Paul Brickhill about Operation Chastise
The Dam Busters (film), a 1955 film about Operation Chastise, based on Paul Brickhill's eponymous 1951 book
"The Dam Busters March", the theme to the 1955 film by British composer Eric Coates
The Dam Busters (video game), a 1984 video game loosely based on Operation Chastise
"Dambusters", a 2011 episode of Ice Pilots NWT Season 3 about recreating Operation Chastise
VFA-195 (U.S. Navy), a United States Navy fighter squadron
A name for people who work in dam removal
One of the 52 games in Action 52
Dambuster Studios, a game development company